Marcos Alonso Peña (1 October 1959 – 9 February 2023) was a Spanish football player and manager. 

Known simply as Marcos in his playing days, he played mainly as a right winger but also as a forward. He amassed La Liga totals of 302 games and 46 goals over 13 seasons, with five being spent at Atlético Madrid and five at Barcelona.

A Spain international during the 1980s, Marcos represented the nation at Euro 1984, helping it to finish second. He later worked as a coach.

Club career
Marcos was born in Santander, Cantabria. Following an unsuccessful spell in Real Madrid's academy, he made his La Liga debut aged 17 with his hometown side Racing de Santander. He was first choice in his position during his second professional season, which ended in relegation.

Marcos' reputation continued to grow at Atlético Madrid, and he was at the time the country's most expensive signing when FC Barcelona paid 150 million pesetas for his services in 1982. In his first year he scored six goals in 30 matches in the league, and also an injury time header against Real Madrid in that campaign's Copa del Rey final, which ended with a 2–1 win.

However, Marcos was also one of four Barça players who failed to find the net in the final of the 1985–86 European Cup against FC Steaua București, in a penalty shootout loss, as goalkeeper Helmuth Duckadam saved all taken attempts. He retired in 1991 after a return to Atlético Madrid, marred by a serious knee injury, and after helping his first club Racing to return to the Segunda División.

Subsequently, Alonso became a coach. In his first experience he led lowly Rayo Vallecano to a first-ever victory over Real Madrid at the Santiago Bernabéu Stadium (2–1), managing Racing and Sevilla FC afterwards (one top-flight promotion with the latter followed by immediate relegation).

In the 2000s, Alonso was in charge of Atlético Madrid – second tier, no promotion– Real Zaragoza, Real Valladolid, Málaga CF and Granada 74 CF.

International career
Alonso earned 22 caps for Spain, the first coming on 25 March 1981 in a 2–1 friendly win in England. He represented the nation at UEFA Euro 1984, being an unused squad member in an eventual runner-up finish.

Personal life and death
Alonso's father, Marcos Alonso Imaz, was also a footballer, who represented Real Madrid in the 1950s and 1960s. His son Marcos Alonso Mendoza also played in the club's youth system and with Spain.

Alonso died on 9 February 2023 at age 63, due to cancer.

Career statistics
Scores and results list Spain's goal tally first, score column indicates score after each Alonso goal.

Honours
Barcelona
La Liga: 1984–85
Copa del Rey: 1982–83; runner-up 1983–84, 1985–86
Supercopa de España: 1983; runner-up 1985
Copa de la Liga: 1983
European Cup runner-up: 1985–86

Racing Santander
Segunda División B: 1990–91

Spain
UEFA European Championship runner-up: 1984

References

External links

1959 births
2023 deaths
Deaths from cancer in Spain
Spanish footballers
Footballers from Santander, Spain
Association football wingers
Association football forwards
La Liga players
Segunda División B players
Racing de Santander players
Atlético Madrid footballers
FC Barcelona players
CD Logroñés footballers
Spain youth international footballers
Spain under-21 international footballers
Spain under-23 international footballers
Spain amateur international footballers
Spain B international footballers
Spain international footballers
UEFA Euro 1984 players
Olympic footballers of Spain
Footballers at the 1980 Summer Olympics
Spanish football managers
La Liga managers
Segunda División managers
Rayo Vallecano managers
Racing de Santander managers
Sevilla FC managers
Atlético Madrid managers
Real Zaragoza managers
Real Valladolid managers
Málaga CF managers
Alonso family (Madrid)